St. Eleutherius of Nicomedia (died 303) was a soldier who was martyred under Diocletian.  He was accused of trying to burn the palace of Diocletian. His feast day is October 2.

In popular culture
 St. Eleutherius of Nicomedia is one of the saints that appears to come to life to chastise Reverend Lovejoy in the season 8 episode of The Simpsons, "In Marge We Trust".

References

Sources
 saints.sqpn.com
 St. Eleutherius - Saints & Angels - Catholic Online

4th-century Christian martyrs